Kubilius is  a Lithuanian language family name, literally meaning "the cooper". It may refer to:

Andrius Kubilius, Lithuanian politician
Vytautas Kubilius, Lithuanian literary critic and political activist
Walter Kubilius, American science fiction writer
Jonas Kubilius, Lithuanian mathematician, former rector of Vilnius University
Marcelė Kubiliūtė, Lithuanian public figure

References

Lithuanian-language surnames